Modernity, a topic in the humanities and social sciences, is both a historical period (the modern era) and the ensemble of particular socio-cultural norms, attitudes and practices that arose in the wake of the Renaissancein the "Age of Reason" of 17th-century thought and the 18th-century "Enlightenment". Some commentators consider the era of modernity to have ended by 1930, with World War II in 1945, or the 1980s or 1990s; the following era is called postmodernity. The term "contemporary history" is also used to refer to the post-1945 timeframe, without assigning it to either the modern or postmodern era. (Thus "modern" may be used as a name of a particular era in the past, as opposed to meaning "the current era".)

Depending on the field, "modernity" may refer to different time periods or qualities. In historiography, the 16th to 18th centuries are usually described as early modern, while the long 19th century corresponds to "modern history" proper. While it includes a wide range of interrelated historical processes and cultural phenomena (from fashion to modern warfare), it can also refer to the subjective or existential experience of the conditions they produce, and their ongoing impact on human culture, institutions, and politics.

As an analytical concept and normative idea, modernity is closely linked to the ethos of philosophical and aesthetic modernism; political and intellectual currents that intersect with the Enlightenment; and subsequent developments such as existentialism, modern art, the formal establishment of social science, and contemporaneous antithetical developments such as Marxism. It also encompasses the social relations associated with the rise of capitalism, and shifts in attitudes associated with secularisation, liberalization, modernization and post-industrial life.

By the late 19th and 20th centuries, modernist art, politics, science and culture has come to dominate not only Western Europe and North America, but almost every populated area on the globe, including movements thought of as opposed to the West and globalization. The modern era is closely associated with the development of individualism, capitalism, urbanization and a belief in the possibilities of technological and political progress. Wars and other perceived problems of this era, many of which come from the effects of rapid change, and the connected loss of strength of traditional religious and ethical norms, have led to many reactions against modern development. Optimism and belief in constant progress has been most recently criticized by postmodernism while the dominance of Western Europe and Anglo-America over other continents has been criticized by postcolonial theory.

In the context of art history, "modernity" (modernité) has a more limited sense, "modern art" covering the period of  1860–1970. Use of the term in this sense is attributed to Charles Baudelaire, who in his 1864 essay "The Painter of Modern Life", designated the "fleeting, ephemeral experience of life in an urban metropolis", and the responsibility art has to capture that experience. In this sense, the term refers to "a particular relationship to time, one characterized by intense historical discontinuity or rupture, openness to the novelty of the future, and a heightened sensitivity to what is unique about the present".

Etymology
The Late Latin adjective modernus, a derivation from the adverb modo ("presently, just now"), is attested from the 5th century CE, at first in the context of distinguishing the Christian era of the Later Roman Empire from the Pagan era of the Greco-Roman world. In the 6th century CE, Roman historian and statesman Cassiodorus appears to have been the first writer to use modernus ("modern") regularly to refer to his own age.

The terms antiquus and modernus were used in a chronological sense in the Carolingian era. For example, a magister modernus referred to a contemporary scholar, as opposed to old authorities such as Benedict of Nursia. In its early medieval usage, the term modernus referred to authorities regarded in medieval Europe as younger than the Greco-Roman scholars of Classical antiquity and/or the Church Fathers of the Christian era, but not necessarily to the present day, and could include authors several centuries old, from about the time of Bede, i.e. referring to the time after the foundation of the Order of Saint Benedict and/or the fall of the Western Roman Empire.

The Latin adjective was adopted in Middle French, as moderne, by the 15th century, and hence, in the early Tudor period, into Early Modern English. The early modern word meant "now existing", or "pertaining to the present times", not necessarily with a positive connotation. English author and playwright William Shakespeare used the term modern in the sense of "every-day, ordinary, commonplace".

The word entered wide usage in the context of the late 17th-century quarrel of the Ancients and the Moderns within the Académie Française, debating the question of "Is Modern culture superior to Classical (Græco–Roman) culture?" In the context of this debate, the "ancients" (anciens) and "moderns" (modernes) were proponents of opposing views, the former believing that contemporary writers could do no better than imitate the genius of Classical antiquity, while the latter,  first with Charles Perrault (1687), proposed that more than a mere "Renaissance" of ancient achievements, the "Age of Reason" had gone beyond what had been possible in the Classical period of the Greco-Roman civilization. The term modernity, first coined in the 1620s, in this context assumed the implication of a historical epoch following the Renaissance, in which the achievements of antiquity were surpassed.

Phases
Modernity has been associated with cultural and intellectual movements of 1436–1789 and extending to the 1970s or later.

According to Marshall Berman, modernity is periodized into three conventional phases dubbed "Early," "Classical," and "Late" by Peter Osborne:

 Early modernity: 1500–1789 (or 1453–1789 in traditional historiography)
 People were beginning to experience a more modern life (Laughey, 31). 
 Classical modernity: 1789–1900 (corresponding to the long 19th century (1789–1914) in Hobsbawm's scheme)
 Consisted of the rise and growing use of daily newspapers, telegraphs, telephones and other forms of mass media, which influenced the growth of communicating on a broader scale (Laughey, 31).
 Late modernity: 1900–1989
 Consisted of the globalization of modern life (Laughey, 31).

In the second phase, Berman draws upon the growth of modern technologies such as the newspaper, telegraph and other forms of mass media. There was a great shift into modernization in the name of industrial capitalism. Finally in the third phase, modernist arts and individual creativity marked the beginning of a new modernist age as it combats oppressive politics, economics as well as other social forces including mass media.

Some authors, such as Lyotard and Baudrillard, believe that modernity ended in the mid- or late 20th century and thus have defined a period subsequent to modernity, namely Postmodernity (1930s/1950s/1990s–present). Other theorists, however, regard the period from the late 20th century to the present as merely another phase of modernity; Zygmunt Bauman calls this phase "liquid" modernity, Giddens labels it "high" modernity (see High modernism).

Definition

Political
Politically, modernity's earliest phase starts with Niccolò Machiavelli's works which openly rejected the medieval and Aristotelian style of analyzing politics by comparison with ideas about how things should be, in favour of realistic analysis of how things really are. He also proposed that an aim of politics is to control one's own chance or fortune, and that relying upon providence actually leads to evil. Machiavelli argued, for example, that violent divisions within political communities are unavoidable, but can also be a source of strength which lawmakers and leaders should account for and even encourage in some ways.

Machiavelli's recommendations were sometimes influential upon kings and princes, but eventually came to be seen as favoring free republics over monarchies. Machiavelli in turn influenced Francis Bacon, Marchamont Needham, James Harrington, John Milton, David Hume., and many others.

Important modern political doctrines which stem from the new Machiavellian realism include Mandeville's influential proposal that "Private Vices by the dextrous Management of a skilful Politician may be turned into Publick Benefits" (the last sentence of his Fable of the Bees), and also the doctrine of a constitutional "separation of powers" in government, first clearly proposed by Montesquieu. Both these principles are enshrined within the constitutions of most modern democracies. It has been observed that while Machiavelli's realism saw a value to war and political violence, his lasting influence has been "tamed" so that useful conflict was deliberately converted as much as possible to formalized political struggles and the economic "conflict" encouraged between free, private enterprises.

Starting with Thomas Hobbes, attempts were made to use the methods of the new modern physical sciences, as proposed by Bacon and Descartes, applied to humanity and politics. Notable attempts to improve upon the methodological approach of Hobbes include those of John Locke, Spinoza, Giambattista Vico,  and Rousseau. David Hume made what he considered to be the first proper attempt at trying to apply Bacon's scientific method to political subjects, rejecting some aspects of the approach of Hobbes.

Modernist republicanism openly influenced the foundation of republics during the Dutch Revolt (1568–1609), English Civil War (1642–1651), American Revolution (1775–1783), the French Revolution (1789–1799), and the Haitian revolution (1791–1804).

A second phase of modernist political thinking begins with Rousseau, who questioned the natural rationality and sociality of humanity and proposed that human nature was much more malleable than had been previously thought. By this logic, what makes a good political system or a good man is completely dependent upon the chance path a whole people has taken over history. This thought influenced the political (and aesthetic) thinking of Immanuel Kant, Edmund Burke and others and led to a critical review of modernist politics. On the conservative side, Burke argued that this understanding encouraged caution and avoidance of radical change. However more ambitious movements also developed from this insight into human culture, initially Romanticism and Historicism, and eventually both the Communism of Karl Marx, and the modern forms of nationalism inspired by the French Revolution, including, in one extreme, the German Nazi movement.

On the other hand, the notion of modernity has been contested also due to its Euro-centric underpinnings. This is further aggravated by the re-emergence of non-Western powers. Yet, the contestations about modernity are also linked with Western notions of democracy, social discipline, and development.

Sociological

In sociology, a discipline that arose in direct response to the social problems of "modernity", the term most generally refers to the social conditions, processes, and discourses consequent to the Age of Enlightenment. In the most basic terms, British sociologist Anthony Giddens describes modernity as

Other writers have criticized such definitions as just being a listing of factors. They argue that modernity, contingently understood as marked by an ontological formation in dominance, needs to be defined much more fundamentally in terms of different ways of being. 

This means that modernity overlays earlier formations of traditional and customary life without necessarily replacing them. In a 2006 review essay, historian Michael Saler extended and substantiated this premise, noting that scholarship had revealed historical perspectives on "modernity" that encompassed both enchantment and disenchantment. Late Victorians, for instance, "discussed science in terms of magical influences and vital correspondences, and when vitalism began to be superseded by more mechanistic explanations in the 1830s, magic still remained part of the discourse—now called 'natural magic,' to be sure, but no less 'marvelous' for being the result of determinate and predictable natural processes." Mass culture, despite its "superficialities, irrationalities, prejudices, and problems," became "a vital source of contingent and rational enchantments as well." Occultism could contribute to the conclusions reached by "modern" psychologists and advanced a "satisfaction" found in this mass culture. In addition, Saler observed that "different accounts of modernity may stress diverse combinations or accentuate some factors more than others...Modernity is defined less by binaries arranged in an implicit hierarchy, or by the dialectical transformation of one term into its opposite, than by unresolved contradictions and oppositions, or antinomies: modernity is Janus-faced." 

In 2020, Jason Crawford critiqued this recent historiography on enchantment and "modernity." The historical evidence of "enchantments" for these studies, particularly in mass and print cultures, "might offer some solace to the citizens of a disenchanted world, but they don’t really change the condition of that world." These "enchantments" offered a "troubled kind of unreality" increasingly separate from "modernity." Per Osterrgard and James Fitchett advanced a thesis that mass culture, while generating sources for "enchantment," more commonly produced "simulations" of "enchantments" and "disenchantments" for consumers.

Cultural and philosophical
The era of modernity is characterised socially by industrialisation and the division of labour and philosophically by "the loss of certainty, and the realization that certainty can never be established, once and for all". With new social and philosophical conditions arose fundamental new challenges. Various 19th-century intellectuals, from Auguste Comte to Karl Marx to Sigmund Freud, attempted to offer scientific and/or political ideologies in the wake of secularisation. Modernity may be described as the "age of ideology."

Critical theorists such as Theodor Adorno and Zygmunt Bauman propose that modernity or industrialization represents a departure from the central tenets of the Enlightenment and towards nefarious processes of alienation, such as commodity fetishism and the Holocaust. Contemporary sociological critical theory presents the concept of "rationalization" in even more negative terms than those Weber originally defined. Processes of rationalization—as progress for the sake of progress—may in many cases have what critical theory says is a negative and dehumanising effect on modern society.

Consequent to debate about economic globalization, the comparative analysis of civilizations, and the post-colonial perspective of "alternative modernities," Shmuel Eisenstadt introduced the concept of "multiple modernities". Modernity as a "plural condition" is the central concept of this sociologic approach and perspective, which broadens the definition of "modernity" from exclusively denoting Western European culture to a culturally relativistic definition, thereby: "Modernity is not Westernization, and its key processes and dynamics can be found in all societies".

Secularization

Modernity, or the Modern Age, is typically defined as a post-traditional, and post-medieval historical period, 66–67). Central to modernity is emancipation from religion, specifically the hegemony of Christianity (mainly Roman Catholicism), and the consequent secularization. According to writers like Fackenheim and Husserl, modern thought repudiates the Judeo-Christian belief in the Biblical God as a mere relic of superstitious ages. It all started with Descartes' revolutionary methodic doubt, which transformed the concept of truth in the concept of certainty, whose only guarantor is no longer God or the Church, but Man's subjective judgement.

Theologians have adapted in different ways to the challenge of modernity. Liberal theology, over perhaps the past 200 years or so, has tried, in various iterations, to accommodate, or at least tolerate, modern doubt in expounding Christian revelation, while Traditionalist Catholics, Eastern Orthodox and fundamentalist Protestant thinkers and clerics have tried to fight back, denouncing skepticism of every kind.  Modernity aimed towards "a progressive force promising to liberate humankind from ignorance and irrationality",  but as of 2021, Hindu fundamentalism in India and Islamic fundamentalism particularly in the Middle East remain problematic, meaning that intra-society value conflicts are by no means an intrinsically Christian phenomenon.

Scientific

In the 16th and 17th centuries, Copernicus, Kepler, Galileo and others developed a new approach to physics and astronomy which changed the way people came to think about many things. Copernicus presented new models of the Solar System which no longer placed humanity's home, Earth, in the centre. Kepler used mathematics to discuss physics and described regularities of nature this way. Galileo actually made his famous proof of uniform acceleration in freefall using mathematics.

Francis Bacon, especially in his Novum Organum, argued for a new methodological approach. It was an experimental based approach to science, which sought no knowledge of formal or final causes. Yet, he was no materialist. He also talked of the two books of God, God's Word (Scripture) and God's work (nature). But he also added a theme that science should seek to control nature for the sake of humanity, and not seek to understand it just for the sake of understanding. In both these things he was influenced by Machiavelli's earlier criticism of medieval Scholasticism, and his proposal that leaders should aim to control their own fortune.

Influenced both by Galileo's new physics and Bacon, René Descartes argued soon afterward that mathematics and geometry provided a model of how scientific knowledge could be built up in small steps. He also argued openly that human beings themselves could be understood as complex machines.

Isaac Newton, influenced by Descartes, but also, like Bacon, a proponent of experimentation, provided the archetypal example of how both Cartesian mathematics, geometry and theoretical deduction on the one hand, and Baconian experimental observation and induction on the other hand, together could lead to great advances in the practical understanding of regularities in nature.

Technological

One common conception of modernity is the condition of Western history since the mid-15th century, or roughly the European development of movable type and the printing press. In this context the "modern" society is said to develop over many periods, and to be influenced by important events that represent breaks in the continuity.

Artistic

After modernist political thinking had already become widely known in France, Rousseau's re-examination of human nature led to a new criticism of the value of reasoning itself which in turn led to a new understanding of less rationalistic human activities, especially the arts. The initial influence was upon the movements known as German Idealism and Romanticism in the 18th and 19th century. Modern art therefore belongs only to the later phases of modernity.

For this reason art history keeps the term "modernity" distinct from the terms Modern Age and Modernism – as a discrete "term applied to the cultural condition in which the seemingly absolute necessity of innovation becomes a primary fact of life, work, and thought". And modernity in art "is more than merely the state of being modern, or the opposition between old and new".

In the essay "The Painter of Modern Life" (1864), Charles Baudelaire gives a literary definition: "By modernity I mean the transitory, the fugitive, the contingent".

Advancing technological innovation, affecting artistic technique and the means of manufacture, changed rapidly the possibilities of art and its status in a rapidly changing society. Photography challenged the place of the painter and painting. Architecture was transformed by the availability of steel for structures.

Theological
From conservative Protestant theologian Thomas C. Oden's perspective, "modernity" is marked by "four fundamental values":
 "Moral relativism (which says that what is right is dictated by culture, social location, and situation)"
 "Autonomous individualism (which assumes that moral authority comes essentially from within)"
 "Narcissistic hedonism (which focuses on egocentric personal pleasure)"
 "Reductive naturalism (which reduces what is reliably known to what one can see, hear, and empirically investigate)"
Modernity rejects anything "old" and makes "novelty ... a criterion for truth." This results in a great "phobic response to anything antiquarian." In contrast, "classical Christian consciousness" resisted "novelty".

Within Roman Catholicism, Pope Pius IX and Pope Pius X claim that Modernism (in a particular definition of the Catholic Church) is a danger to the Christian faith. Pope Pius IX compiled a Syllabus of Errors published on December 8, 1864, to describe his objections to Modernism. Pope Pius X further elaborated on the characteristics and consequences of Modernism, from his perspective, in an encyclical entitled "Pascendi dominici gregis" (Feeding the Lord's Flock) on September 8, 1907. Pascendi Dominici Gregis states that the principles of Modernism, taken to a logical conclusion, lead to atheism. The Roman Catholic Church was serious enough about the threat of Modernism that it required all Roman Catholic clergy, pastors, confessors, preachers, religious superiors and seminary professors to swear an Oath Against Modernism from 1910 until this directive was rescinded in 1967, in keeping with the directives of the Second Vatican Council.

Defined
Of the available conceptual definitions in sociology, modernity is "marked and defined by an obsession with 'evidence'," visual culture, and personal visibility. Generally, the large-scale social integration constituting modernity, involves the:
 increased movement of goods, capital, people, and information among formerly discrete populations, and consequent influence beyond the local area
 increased formal social organization of mobile populaces, development of "circuits" on which they and their influence travel, and societal standardization conducive to socio-economic mobility
 increased specialization of the segments of society, i.e., division of labor, and area inter-dependency
 increased level of excessive stratification in terms of social life of a modern man 
 Increased state of dehumanisation, dehumanity, unionisation, as man became embittered about the negative turn of events which sprouted a growing fear. 
 man became a victim of the underlying circumstances presented by the modern world 
 Increased competitiveness amongst people in the society (survival of the fittest) as the jungle rule sets in.

See also

Notes

References

Bibliography

 
 
 
 
 
 
 
 
 
 
 
 
 
 
 
 
 
 
 
 
 
 
 
 
 
 
 
 
 
 
 
 
.

Further reading

 Adem, Seifudein. 2004. "Decolonizing Modernity: Ibn-Khaldun and Modern Historiography." In Islam: Past, Present and Future, International Seminar on Islamic Thought Proceedings, edited by Ahmad Sunawari Long, Jaffary Awang, and Kamaruddin Salleh, 570–87. Salangor Darul Ehsan, Malaysia: Department of Theology and Philosophy, Faculty of Islamic Studies, Universiti Kebangsaan Malaysia.
 Arendt, Hannah. 1958. "The Origins Of Totalitarianism" Cleavland: World Publishing Co. 
 Buci-Glucksmann, Christine. 1994. Baroque Reason: The Aesthetics of Modernity. Thousand Oaks, Calif: Sage Publications.  (cloth)  (pbk)
 Carroll, Michael Thomas. 2000. Popular Modernity in America: Experience, Technology, Mythohistory. SUNY Series in Postmodern Culture. Albany: State University of New York Press.  (hc)  (pbk)
 Corchia, Luca. 2008. "Il concetto di modernità in Jürgen Habermas. Un indice ragionato." The Lab's Quarterly/Il Trimestrale del Laboratorio 2:396ff. ISSN 2035-5548.
 Crouch, Christopher. 2000. "Modernism in Art Design and Architecture," New York: St. Martins Press.  (cloth)  (pbk)
 Davidann, Jon Thares. 2019. "The Limits of Westernization: American and East Asians Create Modernity, 1860-1960." Oxford: Routledge.  
 Davies, Oliver. 2004. "The Theological Aesthetics". In The Cambridge Companion to Hans Urs von Balthasar, edited by Edward T. Oakes and David Moss, 131–42. Cambridge and New York: Cambridge University Press. .
 Dipper, Christof: Moderne (modernity), version: 2.0, in: Docupedia Zeitgeschichte, 22. November 2018
 Eisenstadt, Shmuel Noah. 2003. Comparative Civilizations and Multiple Modernities, 2 vols. Leiden and Boston: Brill.
 Everdell, William R. 1997. The First Moderns: Profiles in the Origins of Twentieth-Century Thought. Chicago: University of Chicago Press.  (cloth);  (pbk).
 Gaonkar, Dilip Parameshwar (ed.). 2001. Alternative Modernities. A Millennial Quartet Book. Durham: Duke University Press.  (cloth);  (pbk)
 Giddens, Anthony. 1990. The Consequences of Modernity. Stanford: Stanford University Press.  (cloth);  (pbk); Cambridge, UK: Polity Press in association with Basil Blackwell, Oxford. 
 Horváth, Ágnes, 2013. Modernism and Charisma. Houndmills, Basingstoke: Palgrave Macmillan.  (cloth)
 Jarzombek, Mark. 2000. The Psychologizing of Modernity: Art, Architecture, History. Cambridge: Cambridge University Press.
 Kolakowsi, Leszek. 1990. Modernity on Endless Trial. Chicago: University of Chicago Press. 
 Kopić, Mario. Sekstant. Belgrade: Službeni glasnik. 
 Latour, Bruno. 1993. We Have Never Been Modern, translated by Catherine Porter. Cambridge, MA: Harvard University Press.  (hb)  (pbk.)
 Perreau-Saussine, Emile. 2005.  . Commentaire no. 109 (Spring): 181–93.
 Vinje, Victor Condorcet. 2017. The Challenges of Modernity. Nisus Publications.
 Wagner, Peter. 1993. A Sociology of Modernity: Liberty and Discipline. Routledge: London. 
 Wagner, Peter. 2001. Theorizing Modernity. Inescapability and Attainability in Social Theory. SAGE: London.  
 Wagner, Peter. 2008. Modernity as Experience and Interpretation: A New Sociology of Modernity. Polity Press: London.

External links

 
Historiography
Postmodern theory
Modernism
Historical eras
Sociological terminology